Cryptoblepharus ruber, also known as the tawny snake-eyed skink, is a species of lizard in the family Scincidae. It is endemic to Western Australia and Northern Territory.

References

Cryptoblepharus
Skinks of Australia
Endemic fauna of Australia
Reptiles described in 1981
Taxa named by Achim-Rüdiger Börner
Taxa named by Brigitte I. Schüttler